The 2022 Illinois Secretary of State election was held on November 8, 2022, to elect the next Illinois Secretary of State.  Incumbent Democrat Jesse White did not seek re-election to a seventh term. Alexi Giannoulias, a former state treasurer, won the open seat.

Election information
The primaries and general elections will coincide with those for federal congressional races, the state's U.S. Senate race, and those for other state offices. The election will be part of the 2022 Illinois elections.

The primary election was  held on June 28. The general election was held on November 8, 2022.

Democratic primary

Candidates

Nominee
 Alexi Giannoulias, former Illinois state treasurer and nominee for United States Senate in 2010

Eliminated in primary
 David Moore, member of the Chicago City Council from Chicago's 17th ward
 Sidney Moore, Cook County resident
 Anna Valencia, incumbent City Clerk of Chicago.

Withdrawn
 Pat Dowell, member of the Chicago City Council from Chicago's 3rd ward (running for Illinois' 1st congressional district) (endorsed Giannoulias)
 Michael Hastings, state senator

Declined
 Walter Burnett Jr., incumbent member of the Chicago City Council from Chicago's 27th ward
 Mike Frerichs, Illinois State Treasurer (running for reelection)
 Susana Mendoza, Illinois Comptroller (running for reelection)
 Juliana Stratton, incumbent Lieutenant Governor of Illinois (endorsed Anna Valencia)
 Jesse White, incumbent Secretary of State (endorsed Anna Valencia)
 Karen Yarbrough, Cook County clerk, former Cook County recorder of deeds, and former state representative

Endorsements

Polling

Results

Republican primary

Candidates

Nominee
 Dan Brady, state representative since 2001

Eliminated in primary
 John C. Milhiser, former United States Attorney for the Central District of Illinois

Endorsements

Polling

Results

Libertarian convention

Withdrew after winning nomination
Jesse White, automotive factory worker (no relation to incumbent Jesse White)

Replacement candidate
Jon Stewart, former professional wrestler and candidate for Governor of Illinois in 2018 (no relation to talk show host Jon Stewart)

General election

Predictions

Endorsements

Polling

Results

Notes

Partisan clients

References

External links
Official campaign websites
Dan Brady (R) for Secretary of State
Alexi Giannoulias (D) for Secretary of State
Jesse White (L) for Secretary of State

Secretary of State
Illinois
Illinois Secretary of State elections